Mercier (also known as Montreal—Mercier) was a federal electoral district in Quebec, Canada, that was represented in the House of Commons of Canada from 1935 to 2004. In 2003, the district was abolished and split into the La Pointe-de-l'Île and Honoré-Mercier ridings. A provincial electoral district still exists under the same name but is located in Plateau Mont-Royal borough.

History

Mercier riding was created in 1933 from Laval—Two Mountains and Maisonneuve ridings.

It initially consisted of:
 parts of the city of Montreal;
 the towns of Montreal North, St-Michel-de-Laval, St-Léonard-de-Port-Maurice, Montreal East, Pointe-aux-Trembles;
 the parishes of Rivière-des-Prairies, St-Léonard-de-Port-Maurice, and St-Jean-de-Dieu Asylum; and * the municipality of Pont-Viau and the town of Laval-des-Rapides in Laval county..

In 1966, it was defined as consisting of:
 the City of Pointe-aux-Trembles;
 the Towns of Anjou and Montreal East;
 the part of the City of Montreal bounded by Saint-Donat Street, the Towns of Anjou and Montreal East, and Saint-Lawrence River;
 the part of the City of Montreal bounded by the Cities of Pointeaux-Trembles and Montreal North, the Towns of Anjou and Montreal East, and Des Prairies River.

In 1976, it was defined as consisting of:
 the City of Pointe-aux-Trembles;
 the Town of Montreal East;
 the part of the City of Montreal bounded by the Cities of Pointeaux-Trembles and Montreal North, by the Towns of Anjou and Montreal East and by des Prairies River;
 the part of the City of Montreal bounded by a line commencing from the Saint Lawrence River along Saint-Donat Street, the Canadian National Railway; the northeastern limit of the parish municipality of Saint-Jean-de-Dieu, Sherbrooke Street East, Highway 25, the limits of the towns of Anjou and Montreal East to the Saint Lawrence River.

In 1980, it was renamed "Montreal—Mercier".  In 1987, Montreal—Mercier was split into Anjou—Rivière-Des-Prairies and a re-created Mercier riding.  The new Mercier riding also incorporated territory from Gamelin riding.

The new Mercier riding consisted of:
 the Town of Montréal-Est;
 parts of the City of Montréal.

The district was abolished in 2003 when it was split into La Pointe-de-l'Île and Honoré-Mercier ridings.

Members of Parliament

This riding elected the following Members of Parliament:

Election results

Mercier, 1933–1980

|Independent Reconstruction
|Paul-Antoine Bonhomme
|align=right|865

|Radical chrétien
|Georges Rousseau
|align=right|687

Montreal—Mercier, 1981–1987

Mercier, 1987–2003

See also 

 List of Canadian federal electoral districts
 Past Canadian electoral districts

External links

Riding history from the Library of Parliament:
Mercier (1933-1980)
Montreal-Mercier (1981-1987)
Mercier (1987-2003)

Former federal electoral districts of Quebec